Little England beyond Wales is a name that has been applied to an area of southern Pembrokeshire and southwestern Carmarthenshire in Wales, which has been English in language and culture for many centuries despite its remoteness from England. Its origins may lie in the Irish, Norse, Norman, Flemish and Saxon settlement that took place in this area more than in other areas of South West Wales. Its northern boundary is known as the Landsker Line.

A number of writers and scholars, ancient and modern, have discussed how and when this difference came about, and why it should persist, with no clear explanation coming to the fore.

Etymology
The language boundary between this region and the area to the north where Welsh is more commonly spoken, sometimes known as the Landsker Line, is noted for its sharpness and resilience. Although it is probably much older, the first known approximation of "Little England beyond Wales" was in the 16th century, when William Camden called the area Anglia Transwalliana.

History
Between 350 and 400, an Irish tribe known as the Déisi settled in the region known to the Romans as Demetae. The Déisi merged with the local Welsh, with the regional name underlying Demetae evolving into Dyfed (410–920), which existed as an independent petty kingdom. The area became part of the kingdom of Deheubarth (920–1197), but it is unclear when it became distinguished from other parts of Wales. Welsh scholar Dr B. G. Charles surveyed the evidence for early non-Welsh settlements in the area. The Norse raided in the 9th and 10th centuries, and some may have settled, as they did in Gwynedd further north. There are scattered Scandinavian placenames in the area, mostly in the Hundred of Roose, north and west of the River Cleddau. The medieval Welsh chronicle Brut y Tywysogion mentions many battles in southwest Wales and sackings of Menevia (St David's) in the pre-Norman period. Sometimes these were stated to be conflicts with Saxons, sometimes with people of unspecified origin. The Saxons influenced the language. John Trevisa, writing in 1387, said:

Norman period
Early documentary evidence of Flemish immigration from England, rather than directly from Flanders, is given by contemporary William of Malmesbury (1095–1143), who wrote:  The fact that they came via England, and that at that time the Flemish language was not markedly different from English, was likely to have influenced the English language becoming, and remaining, the dominant language of the area.

Another contemporary writer, Caradoc of Llancarfan (fl. 1135), was more explicit: 

A second batch of Flemings were sent to southwest Wales by King Henry in about 1113. According to Brut y Tywysogyon he: 

Unsurprisingly, then, the Flemish language did not survive in the local dialect. Ranulf Higdon in his Polychronicon (1327) stated that Flemish was by his time extinct in southwest Wales, and George Owen in 1603 was adamant that Flemish was long extinct.

Post-Norman period
In 1155, under the orders of the new King Henry II, a third wave of Flemings were sent to Rhys ap Gruffydd's West Wales territories.

Gerald of Wales (c.1146-c.1223) and Brut y Tywysogyon recorded that "Flemings" were settled in south Pembrokeshire soon after the Norman invasion of Wales in the early 12th century. Gerald says this took place specifically in Roose. The Flemish were noted for their skill in the construction of castles, which were built throughout the Norman territories in Pembrokeshire. The previous inhabitants were said to have "lost their land", but this could mean either a total expulsion of the existing population, or merely a replacement of the land-owning class. The development of Haverfordwest as the castle and borough controlling Roose dates from this period; this plantation occurred under the auspices of the Norman invaders. The Normans placed the whole of Southwest Wales under military control, establishing castles over the entire area, as far north as Cardigan.

What followed, starting with the reign of Edward I in the late 13th century, was 100 years of peace, particularly in "Little England", marked by subjugation of the Welsh by the English crown, which must have compounded the tendency of Welsh to become a minor language in the region. With the failure of Owain Glyndŵr's war of independence in the early 15th century, in which no fighting took place in "little England", came draconian laws affecting Wales, though these were, for reasons historians have not been able to ascertain, applied less rigorously here than elsewhere in Wales.

National awareness of the region was made much of in the 15th century with the birth of Henry Tudor at Pembroke Castle and his eventual accession to the throne of England after beginning his campaign in southwest Wales. At the end of the Tudor period, George Owen produced his Description of Penbrokshire (sic), completed in 1603. The work is essentially a geographical analysis of the languages in the county, and his writings provide the vital source for all subsequent commentators. He is the first to emphasize the sharpness of the linguistic boundary. He said: 

Of Little England, he added: 

Owen described the linguistic frontier in some detail, and his 1603 line is shown on the map. His description indicates that some northern parts had been re-colonised by Welsh speakers. The disruptions of the post-Black Death period may account for this.

Modern period

Although Little England is described by several later writers other than Laws, they do little but quote Owen. Richard Fenton in his Historical Tour of 1810 observed that churches in the south of the county were more likely to have spires than those in the north. Quantitative descriptions of the linguistic geography of the area start with that of Ernst Georg Ravenstein, around 1870. This shows a further shrinkage since Owen's time. From 1891 onward, linguistic affiliation in Wales has been assessed in the census. The overall picture is that the boundary has moved to a significant, but small degree. Furthermore, the boundary has always been described as sharp. In 1972, Brian John said of the linguistic boundary that it "is a cultural feature of surprising tenacity; it is quite as discernible, and only a little less strong, than the divide of four centuries ago."

Aspects of the South Pembrokeshire dialect were noted from a talk at the British Library given by Marloes inhabitants in 1976; their dialect showed distinctive similarities to the English spoken in the West Country of England, as opposed to the English spoken in south east Wales.

Prior to the 1997 Welsh devolution referendum, which resulted in the creation of the National Assembly for Wales (now the Senedd), it was reported that Pembrokeshire's vote could be key.

The differences in the proportion of Welsh speakers persist, illustrated by the map derived from the 2011 census, and the name has persisted into the 21st century; in 2015 Tenby was quoted as being "traditionally the heart of Little England beyond Wales".  

In 2022, the ice cream maker Upton Farm, based at Pembroke Dock, was criticised for using the phrase "Made for you in little England beyond Wales" in their packaging.  The company agreed to remove the reference in future, and replace it "with messaging that more clearly celebrates our Welshness".

Overview

As for placenames, the greatest concentration of Anglo-Saxon names is in the former hundred of Roose, which had pre-Norman origins, while there are considerable numbers of Welsh placenames in the rest of Little England, although these areas were certainly English-speaking. Flemish names, Fenton noted, are rarely found in early documents, supporting Owen's statement: 

but that: 

Fenton adds: 

On the Gower Peninsula, the sharp distinction between the English- and Welsh-speaking populations has been referred to as the "Englishry" and the "Welshry". As mentioned by Owen, the cultural differences between Little England and the "Welshry" extend beyond language. Manorial villages are more common in Little England, particularly on the banks of the Daugleddau estuary, while the north has characteristically Welsh scattered settlements. Forms of agriculture are also distinct.

On the other hand, Little England and the Welshry have many similarities. Typical Welsh surnames of patronymic origin (e.g. Edwards, Richards, Phillips etc.) were almost universal in the Welshry in Owen's time, but they also accounted for 40 per cent of names in Little England. According to John, the majority of English-speaking Little England natives today regard themselves as Welsh, as did Gerald, who was born on the south coast at Manorbier in 1146.

Most recently, David Austin labels "Little England" a myth and questions the process by which the language came about, attributing it to a combination of land manipulation and Tudor "aspirant gentry".

Genetic studies
Welsh academic Morgan Watkin claimed that levels of type A blood in South Pembrokeshire were 5–10 per cent higher than in surrounding areas. Watkin suggested that this was due to Viking settlement in the area, rather than the forcible transfer of a colony of Flemish refugees to the area, by King Henry I, in the early 12th century. However, the geneticist Brian Sykes later commented that – while the levels of blood group A in the Low Countries were not particularly high – it was not possible to tell whether the high levels in "Little England" were caused "by rampaging Vikings or by a few cartloads of Belgians". Sykes also commented that, based on the findings of his Oxford Genetic Atlas Project, there was a lack of patrilineal Y-chromosomes from the "Sigurd" clan (haplogroup R1a) in South Wales in general, which was strong evidence against Viking settlement, and meant that Watkin's theory regarding the high frequency of type A blood in "Little England" was wrong.

A 2003 Y-chromosome study in Haverfordwest revealed an Anglo-Celtic population similar to populations in South West England.

Researchers at the Wellcome Trust Centre for Human Genetics reported in 2015 "unexpectedly stark differences between inhabitants in the north and south of the Welsh county of Pembrokeshire" in DNA signatures.

See also 
Landsker Borderlands Trail – a waymarked long-distance footpath through this region.
Cultural relationship between the Welsh and the English

References

Further reading
 Aitchison, John W., and Carter, Harold, The Welsh Language 1961–1981: an interpretive atlas, UoW Press, 1985, 
 Bowen, E. G., (Ed.), Wales: a Physical, Historical and Regional Geography, Methuen, 1957
 Davies, Thomas, Penfro Gymreig a Seisnig a'i Phobl in Y Berniad 4, 1914, pp 233–238.
 Fenton, Richard, A historical tour through Pembrokeshire. Longman, Hurst, Rees, Orme &Co, 1811 Internet Archive PDF
 Jenkins, Geraint. H., (ed) The Welsh Language before the Industrial Revolution, UoW Press, 1997, 
 Jenkins, Geraint. H., (ed) Language and Community in the 19th Century, UoW Press, 1998, 
 Jenkins, Geraint. H., (ed) The Welsh language and its social domains 1801–1911, UoW Press, 2000, 
 Jones, Emrys, and Griffiths, Ieuan L., A linguistic map of Wales: 1961, in The Geographical Journal, 129, part 2, 1963, p 195
 Laws, Edward. The History of Little England Beyond Wales, London, 1888 Internet Archive
 Mais, S. P. B. Little England Beyond Wales
 Pryce, W. T. R., Welsh and English in Wales, 1750–1971: A Spatial Analysis Based on the Linguistic Affiliation of Parochial Communities in Bulletin of the Board of Celtic Studies, 28, 1978, pp 1–36.
 Thomas, J. Gareth, The geographical distribution of the Welsh language, in The Geographical Journal, 122, part 1, 1956, pp 71–79
 Williams, D. Trevor, Linguistic divides in South Wales: a historico-geographical study, in Archaeologia Cambrensis 90, 1935, pp 239–66
 Williams, D. Trevor, A linguistic map of Wales according to the 1931 census, with some observations on its historical and geographical setting, in The Geographical Journal, 89, part 2, 1937, p 146-51

English-speaking countries and territories
Geography of Pembrokeshire
Genetics in the United Kingdom
History of Wales
Medieval Wales
Welsh English
Welsh language